Joseph Aidoo (born 29 September 1995) is a Ghanaian professional footballer who plays as a centre-back for Spanish club Celta Vigo and the Ghana national team.

Club career

Inter Allies
He started his professional football career at Inter Allies in the First Capital Plus Premier League. In 2013–14, Aidoo was nominated in the category Defender of the year in the domestic top tier, but eventually missed out on the award. Aidoo was the club captain during the season of 2014–15.

Hammarby IF
In August 2015, Swedish club Hammarby IF in Allsvenskan signed Aidoo on a six-month loan deal. He made his debut, and his only appearance during the 2015 season, against then reigning champions Malmö FF on 25 October 2015. Even though Hammarby lost with a score of 0–1, Aidoo put on an impressive performance being voted Hammarby player of the game.

Before the 2016 Allsvenskan season, he signed for Hammarby IF permanently on a three-year deal. He made his first league appearance of the season against Malmö FF on 18 May, playing the first half before being substituted at halftime. Mid through the campaign, manager Nanne Bergstrand chose to swap the two central defenders, with Aidoo and newly signed David Boo Wiklander making their entrances as regular starters. Out of the following 11 games, Hammarby won an impressive seven – also keeping a clean sheet in six consecutive away fixtures. Aidoo scored his first competitive goal for Hammarby on 12 September 2016, in a 1–1 draw against Örebro SK on home turf.

Aidoo started the 2017 season in fine form, with Hammarby only conceding five goals in the six league games. Aidoo's performances led to him being named in April's best eleven for African players over the world, in the magazine Goal.

Genk
On 24 July 2017, Aidoo completed a transfer to Genk in the Belgian First Division A. He signed a three-year contract with the club, with an option for a further. The transfer fee was reportedly set between €1.25 million and €2 million. He made his debut for the side on 26 August, coming on as a late substitute, in a 1–0 home win against Mechelen. Aidoo scored his first goal for Genk in a 1–0 win against the domestic giants Anderlecht on 22 October, and was also voted as the "man of the match". Between 23 September and 19 November, Genk went on an eight matches long unbeaten streak (five wins and three draws) in the league, with Aidoo starting all of the fixtures.

Celta 
On 11 July 2019, Aidoo agreed to a five-year contract with Spanish La Liga side RC Celta de Vigo for a reported fee of €8 million. His former club Hammarby received €380,000 as part of the deal.

He made his debut for the Galician club on 24 August 2019 in a 1–0 home win against Valencia, starting and playing 90 minutes at center-back.

International career
Aidoo featured in the 2015 FIFA U-20 World Cup for Ghana. He played all four of his side's fixtures, with Ghana eventually getting eliminated by Mali in the quarter finals. He was also called up to the African U-20 Championship earlier the same year, where Ghana finished in third place.

He made his debut for the Ghana national football team on 26 March 2019 in a friendly against Mauritania.

Career statistics

Club

International

Honours
Genk
Belgian First Division A: 2018–19

References

External links

1995 births
Living people
People from Tema
Ghanaian footballers
Ghana under-20 international footballers
Ghana international footballers
Ghanaian expatriate footballers
Allsvenskan players
Belgian Pro League players
La Liga players
International Allies F.C. players
Hammarby Fotboll players
K.R.C. Genk players
RC Celta de Vigo players
Association football defenders
Expatriate footballers in Sweden
Expatriate footballers in Belgium
Expatriate footballers in Spain
2019 Africa Cup of Nations players
2022 FIFA World Cup players